Monte M. Katterjohn (October 20, 1891 – September 8, 1949) was an American screenwriter. He wrote the screenplays for 68 films between 1912 and 1931. He was born in Boonville, Indiana, and died in Evansville, Indiana.

Selected filmography

 The Apostle of Vengeance (1916)
The Gunfighter (1917)
The Flame of the Yukon (1917)
Golden Rule Kate (1917)
 Idolators (1917)
 Princess of the Dark (1917)
 Sweetheart of the Doomed (1917)
 The Weaker Sex (1917)
Madam Who? (1918)
Within the Cup (1918)
 An Alien Enemy (1918)
 Inside the Lines (1918)
 The Lord Loves the Irish (1919)
Silk Husbands and Calico Wives (1920)
The Great Moment (1921)
The Sheik (1921)
 Cold Steel (1921)
The Impossible Mrs. Bellew (1922)
My American Wife (1922)
Prodigal Daughters (1923)
The White Desert (1925)
 The Broadway Boob (1926)
A Social Celebrity (1926)
Walking Back (1928)
 Paradise Island (1930)
Daughter of the Dragon (1931)

External links

Monte M. Katterjohn, 1923 or before (University of Washington, Sayre collection)

1891 births
1949 deaths
American male screenwriters
People from Boonville, Indiana
Writers from Evansville, Indiana
Screenwriters from Indiana
20th-century American male writers
20th-century American screenwriters